The animated science fiction television program Futurama makes a number of satirical and humorous references to religion, including inventing several fictional religions which are explored in certain episodes of the series.

Fictional religions

Robotology 
The episode "Hell Is Other Robots" centers around Bender's becoming addicted to high-voltage electricity, then discovering the religion of Robotology to help him break the habit. Sermons are conducted at the Temple of Robotology by the Reverend Preacherbot, a character whose mannerisms draw heavily on black church preacher stereotypes.  Robotology is a play on the name Scientology, and series creator Matt Groening has said that he received a call from the Church of Scientology concerned about the use of a similar name.

Robotology has a holy text, The Good Book 3.0 which is stored on a 3.5" floppy disk. Two symbols of the religion are shown in the episode.  The first is a zig-zag line with a circle at either end, based on the electronic symbol used for resistors on circuit diagrams. 

Robots who accept Robotology are expected to abstain from behavior such as smoking, pornography, stealing, abusing electricity, and drinking alcohol. Consuming alcohol is usually necessary to power a robot's fuel cells, but this episode establishes that mineral oil is an acceptable substitute.  Sinners are punished by condemnation to Robot Hell, located under an abandoned amusement park in Atlantic City, New Jersey.  The punishments in Robot Hell are similar to the levels and rationale portrayed in Dante's Divine Comedy, specifically the Inferno.

Robot Hell is controlled by the Robot Devil. He is bound by the Fairness in Hell Act of 2275, allowing anyone to win their freedom by defeating him in a fiddle contest with a solid gold fiddle, a reference to the song "The Devil Went Down to Georgia". Should the individual lose the fiddle contest, they will only receive a smaller, silver fiddle and the Robot Devil may kill them at his discretion.

In "Ghost in the Machines", Bender's ghost is sent to an equivalent robot Heaven monitored by a Robot God whose streamlined design is reminiscent of EVE in the Pixar animated film WALL-E. This God appears to be distinct from the more ambiguous, universal 'God' character that appeared in "Godfellas" and "Bender's Big Score", who may or may not have been representative of the Gods of all religions, and/or a machine. Notably, the Robot God does not deny being God and treats Bender's ghost as his subject.

Robot Judaism 
The episode "Future Stock" introduces Robot Judaism in a scene where Fry and Dr. Zoidberg, seeking free food, sneak into a "Bot Mitzvah" celebration (a spoof of the Bar and Bat Mitzvah).  As a joke about Jewish dietary laws' proscriptions against shellfish, Zoidberg was not allowed in (despite having Jewish stereotype qualities) inasmuch as he was an anthropomorphic lobster.  At the Bot Mitzvah, Fry asks a Jewish robot if they don't believe in Robot Jesus, to which the robot replies, "We believe he was built, and that he was a very well-programmed robot, but he wasn't our Messiah".  A banner written in Hebrew reads "Today you are a robot" (with two misspellings), referencing the traditional Jewish belief that a boy becomes a man at age 13, which is celebrated on his Bar Mitzvah. In the episode "The Bots and the Bees" Bender's son, Ben, has a Bot Mitzvah celebration of his own where he becomes a man after being born only a few days prior. This scene reinforces the quick rate at which robots mature in the Futurama world as well as alludes to the practice of robot circumcision.

References to a holiday called 'Robanukah' appear in several episodes, as well, though it is heavily implied that Bender makes up this holiday to avoid work. In the Futurama Holiday Spectacular, the Robanukah story involves a pair of fembots who must wrestle in petroleum oil for six and a half weeks. When the oil, which was predicted to last only four and a half weeks, lasts for 500 million years, Bender declares it a Robanukah miracle.

The First Amalgamated Church 

The First Amalgamated Church is a syncretic denomination of several mainstream religions extant in the 21st century, and is referenced in several episodes. The church and one of its priests, Father Changstein el-Gamal, are introduced in the episode "Godfellas". Father Changstein el-Gamal reappears in "The Sting" at Fry's funeral service, and in Bender's Big Score at Lars and Leela's wedding.  The religion appears to be a mix of Buddhism, Christianity, Judaism, Hinduism, Islam and even agnosticism.

Other religions
Other religions are depicted or mentioned in passing in other episodes. In the episode "Hell Is Other Robots", Professor Farnsworth complains about Bender's devotion to Robotology, saying, "If only he had joined a mainstream religion, like Oprahism or Voodoo".

In the season 2 episode "I Second That Emotion", Fry, Leela, and Bender are shown around the sewer mutants' village. Fry notices a large gold-plated ICBM on the altar of the cathedral and exclaims "Wow! You guys worship an unexploded nuclear bomb?" to which one of the mutants responds "Yeah, but nobody is that observant. It's mostly a Christmas and Easter thing." The altar and the bomb are a reference to the film Beneath the Planet of the Apes,  in which the subterranean mutants worship a nuclear bomb.

The season 4 episode "Where No Fan Has Gone Before", presents the situation of a television show becoming elevated to the status of a religion in the form of the "Church of Trek", where devotees of Star Trek worship the characters and attend services dressed as officers and aliens from the show (in 23rd or 24th century).

In the second Futurama direct-to-video film, The Beast with a Billion Backs, Fry becomes the pope of a new religion which worships the interdimensional planet-sized tentacle monster named Yivo (pronouns: shkle/shkler/shklim), who brainwashed the inhabitants of Earth by attaching shkler tentacles to their brains, before taking them onto shklim, which resembled heaven.

In the third film Bender's Game, Professor Farnsworth invokes the name of "the all-powerful Atheismo".

In the season 7 episode "Free Will Hunting", when Bender walks throughout Chapek 9 looking to discover his never-programmed free-will unit, he happens upon a religious monastery led by a monk named Ab-bot; the abbot takes him in and converts him into his religion called "Order of the Binary Singularity" believing in the promise "Creatrix" or Mom will give them free-will units.

References to existing religions 
Aside from inventing religions, the writers of Futurama also make references to established faiths.

In the episode "When Aliens Attack", Earth is invaded by Omicronians demanding to see the season finale of Single Female Lawyer, a television show which was accidentally knocked off the air 1,000 years earlier by Fry. Professor Farnsworth explains that the show no longer exists because most video tapes from that era were destroyed during the Second Coming of Jesus in the year 2443. Ken Keeler, the writer of the episode, considered this joke one of the most blasphemous lines in the show, because it suggested that the Second Coming had come and gone but life for the unsaved on Earth had carried on much as before.

Jesus is referenced several times throughout the show, the most notable being on "A Tale of Two Santas", where all of the crew dress up as Santa and Zoidberg dresses up as "his friend Jesus" to attempt to stay Bender's execution. When the real Robot Santa appears and attacks the crew and the people attempting to execute Bender, the executioner exclaims "Get him, Jesus!" before diving behind an object, and in reference to Benjamin Franklin's famous remark, Zoidberg replies, "I help those who help themselves."

On several occasions, Professor Farnsworth uses the phrase "Sweet Zombie Jesus!" as an expression of shock or dismay. These exclamations are usually cut for syndication in the United States. In the DVD of Futurama episode "The Deep South," a cut scene shows Farnsworth muttering in his sleep about the Zombie Jesus returning at tea-time, when Farnsworth has no food to supply it.

Another undead figure, Chanukah Zombie, first mentioned in the episode "A Tale of Two Santas", makes an appearance in Bender's Big Score. He teams up with Robot Santa and Kwanzaa Bot to fight alien scam artists who have seized possession of planet Earth. His weapons are themed around Jewish symbols and artifacts, including explosive dreidels and a TIE fighter (a reference to Star Wars; Star Wars actor Mark Hamill supplies Chanukah Zombie's voice) adorned with Stars of David and a menorah.

Catholicism is shown to still exist in some form in the 31st century, as the show makes several references to the "Space Pope": in the opening titles of "Hell is Other Robots" (stating that the show has been "Condemned by the Space Pope"); in "A Bicyclops Built for Two", with Bender's rhetorical question "Is the Space Pope reptilian?"; and in "I Dated a Robot", in an endorsement at the end of an educational film ("Brought to you by the Space Pope").  In the last of these, a graphic displays a picture of the Space Pope as a reptilian alien in Papal vestments, encircled by the words Crocodylus pontifex. Additionally, in the episode "Put Your Head on My Shoulders", Fry and Amy Wong have a lighthearted conversation about their parents' expectations of them; Fry remarks, "What am I, the Pope?" to which Amy replies, "Yeah, and if you were the Pope they'd be all, 'Straighten your Pope hat,' and 'Put on your good vestments!'" In the sixth season episode, "The Duh-Vinci Code", the cast travels to Rome (announced as Future-Roma), where the Space Pope directs the ship's landing at the Vatican. A few episodes later, in "The Silence of the Clamps," the Space Pope is shown conducting the wedding of the Donbot's older daughter.

Conversely, Satanism is also shown to still exist in some form in the 31st century.  In the episode "A Taste of Freedom," Zoidberg's lawyer, Old Man Waterfall, requests a Satanic funeral rite before dying, and Professor Farnsworth, in "The Farnsworth Parabox", when he is presumably creating the box containing the parallel universe, appeals to Satan for help, mentioning that Satan owes him.

It is implied that some form of Neopaganism may still exist in the future, based on references to a lesbian coven across the street from Planet Express in "Future Stock".

In "The Lesser of Two Evils," one of the Miss Universe pageant contestants is an energy being identified, with little fanfare, as "Miss Heaven", suggesting that by the 31st century, Heaven is an accessible part of the universe rather than a divine afterlife attainable only after death. However, another possibility is that Miss Heaven is simply from a conventional planet that has been named "Heaven".

Also, Hermes Conrad, who is Jamaican, claims to be a rastafarian.

Godfellas 
The episode "Godfellas" explores several religious themes in a more earnest and thought-provoking way than any other episode, and without explicitly referencing or parodying any particular religion. Bender is accidentally cast adrift in space and unwittingly becomes a god figure to a race of tiny people (Shrimpkins) living on an asteroid that impacts his body. Bender attempts to answer their prayers, but ends up harming the Shrimpkins. Meanwhile, the Shrimpkins who have migrated to Bender's backside, out of his sight, grow frustrated that their prayers go entirely unanswered. Eventually the two factions of Shrimpkins wipe one another out in a miniature nuclear war.

After Bender's unsuccessful attempt at godhood, he encounters a god-like entity in space. Bender first wonders if the entity is God, because of its awesome power or a computer because it thinks in binary. The entity responds "Possible, I do feel compassion towards all living things" and "Possible, I am user-friendly" respectively, adding "My good chum" to the end both times. Bender eventually theorizes that the entity may have, in fact, been the remains of a satellite that collided with God, to which the entity replies "Probable". The conversation between them touches on the ideas of predestination, prayer, and the nature of salvation, in what Mark Pinsky referred to as a theological turn to the episode which may cause the viewer to need "to be reminded that this is a cartoon and not a divinity school class". By the end of the conversation, Bender's questions still have not been fully answered, and he is left wanting more from the voice than it has given him. The character/entity returned, albeit briefly, in the first of the direct-to-DVD installments, Bender's Big Score.

The episode also sees Fry turning to religion to help locate Bender. Seeking guidance, he visits the First Amalgamated Church. When this fails to help him, Fry visits the "Monks of Dschubba" to use the radio telescope of a sect of monks who are attempting to find God in the universe. This subplot takes religion much more lightly, referring to the monks as a "crazy sect" and suggesting that prayer is usually unreliable.

The episode also makes reference to The Nine Billion Names of God by Arthur C. Clarke.

The book Toons That Teach, a text used by youth groups to teach teenagers about spirituality, recommends the episode "Godfellas" in a lesson teaching about "Faith, God's Will, [and] Image of God".

See also 

 Silicon Heaven – similar concepts of robotic Heaven and Hell are also explored in the Red Dwarf universe.
 Religion in The Simpsons

References 

Futurama
Futurama
Futurama
Futurama